The 378th Air Expeditionary Wing (378 AEW) is a provisional United States Air Forces Central Command unit assigned to Air Combat Command. As a provisional unit, it may be activated or inactivated at any time.

The 378th Bombardment Group was an inactive United States Army Air Forces unit. Its last assignment was with the Army Air Forces Antisubmarine Command at Langley Field, Virginia, where it was stationed from October to December 1942.  The group participated in the Antisubmarine Campaign along the Atlantic coast of the United States until it was inactivated, when the Antisubmarine Command assigned all its squadrons directly to the command's two antisubmarine wings.

The current 378th AEW is garrisoned in Prince Sultan Air Base, Saudi Arabia.

Structure

 378th Air Expeditionary Wing (AEW)
 378th Expeditionary Operations Group (EOG)
77th Expeditionary Fighter Squadron (EFS) 
378th Expeditionary Operations Support Squadron (EOSS) 
 378th Expeditionary Maintenance Squadron (EMS)
 378th Expeditionary Mission Support Group (EMSG)
 378th Expeditionary Civil Engineer Squadron (ECES)
 378th Expeditionary Communications Squadron (ECS)
378th Expeditionary Contracting Squadron (ECONS)
 378th Expeditionary Force Support Squadron (EFSS)
 378th Expeditionary Logistics Readiness Squadron (ELRS)
 378th Expeditionary Security Forces Squadron (ESFS)
378th Expeditionary Medical Group (EMDG)

History

The group was activated at Langley Field, Virginia on October 18, 1942 with the 520th, 521st, and 523d Bombardment Squadrons assigned.  Although designated a medium bombardment unit, it was equipped with Douglas O-46 and North American O-47 single-engine observation aircraft.

The group conducted its operations along the southeastern coast of the United States. Only the 523d Squadron was located with the group's headquarters at Langley. The 520th Squadron operated from Jacksonville Municipal Airport, Florida, while the 521st was stationed at Charleston Army Air Field, South Carolina.

In late November, Army Air Forces Antisubmarine Command began a series of organizational actions to more nearly align it with United States Navy headquarters engaged in the antisubmarine campaign.  On 20 November, the 522d Bombardment Squadron at Lantana Airport, Florida was assigned to the group, At the same time, the group's 520th Squadron was attached directly to the new 25th Antisubmarine Wing, which had been established to manage Army Air Forces antisubmarine units in the area of the Navy's Eastern Sea Frontier.  The group's squadrons were redesignated as antisubmarine squadrons,  Finally, in December, after less than two months of operation, the group was inactivated and its component squadrons were reassigned to the 25th Antisubmarine Wing.

Twenty-first century 

The unit was reactivated as the 378th Air Expeditionary Group and was converted to provisional status on October 24, 2005. It was then redesignated as the 378th Air Expeditionary Wing on November 14, 2019.

The base was expanded by the 621st Contingency Response Group "Devil Raiders" from June 15, 2019.

On December 17, 2019, in response to increasing tensions with Iran, the unit was formally activated as the 378th Air Expeditionary Wing at Prince Sultan Air Base, Saudi Arabia. The newly reactivated wing received its first combat aircraft shortly thereafter, when McDonnell Douglas F-15E Strike Eagles from the 494th Expeditionary Fighter Squadron arrived in early January 2020. The 494th would be replaced by General Dynamics F-16 Fighting Falcons from the Triple Nickel 555th Expeditionary Fighter Squadron in late February 2020. Due to the COVID-19 pandemic, the originally planned March redeployment to Aviano Air Base was rescheduled to 20 April 2020.

In addition to hosting the 494th EFS and 555th EFS for traditional CENTCOM deployments, the 378th AEW has also conducted "Agile Combat Employment" exercises with Lockheed Martin F-35A Lightning II, Northrop Grumman E-8C JSTARS and Boeing E-3 Sentry. The intent of these exercises (which are considerably shorter than a normal deployment) was to demonstrate the Wing's ability to rapidy increase its number and variety of combat aircraft in the event tensions in the region were to escalate.

On May 16, 2020, the Department of Defense confirmed that an undisclosed F-15C Eagle squadron, and United States Marine Corps (USMC) McDonnell Douglas AV-8B Harrier II from Marine Attack Squadron 214 (VMA-214) had replaced the Triple Nickel. The USAF eventually revealed that the F-15C's belonged to the 44th Expeditionary Fighter Squadron.

Harriers assigned to VMA-214 ended their deployment to Prince Sultan on July 21, 2020, while the F-15C's of the 44th EFS returned to Kadena Air Base by October 7, 2020. F-16C's from the 20th Fighter Wing, 77 EFS arrived on October 10, 2020 to replace the departed AV-8B's and F-15C's.

Lineage
 Constituted as the 378th Bombardment Group (Medium) on October 13, 1942
 Activated on December 18, 1942
 Inactivated on December 14, 1942
 Reactivated as the 378th Air Expeditionary Group was converted to provisional status on October 24, 2005
 Redesignated as the 378th Air Expeditionary Wing on November 14, 2019. It operates out of Prince Sultan Airbase, Saudi Arabia.

Assignments 
 Army Air Forces Antisubmarine Command, October 13 — December 14, 1942
 Unknown 2005 — 2019
 Air Combat Command after redesignation & conversion 2019

Squadrons 

 520th Bombardment Squadron (later 15th Antisubmarine Squadron): October 18, - December 14, 1942 (attached to 25th Antisubmarine Wing after November 20)
 521st Bombardment Squadron (later 16th Antisubmarine Squadron): October 18, - December 14, 1942
 522d Bombardment Squadron (later 17th Antisubmarine Squadron): November 20, - December 14, 1942
 523d Bombardment Squadron (later 2d Antisubmarine Squadron): October 18, - 14 December 14, 1942
 494th Expeditionary Fighter Squadron (EFS) (F-15E Strike Eagle): January 3, - March 2020
 555th EFS (F-16CM Fighting Falcon): February - April 20, 2020
 Marine Attack Squadron 214 (VMA-214) (AV-8B Harrier II): May 2020 -July 21, 2020
 44th Expeditionary Fighter Squadron (F-15C Eagle): May 2020 - October 2020
 77th Expeditionary Fighter Squadron (F-16C Fighting Falcon): October 2020 — present
 968th Expeditionary Airborne Air Control Squadron (E-3G Sentry): March 2022 — present
 908th Expeditionary Air Refueling Squadron (KC-10A Extender): March 2022 - prsent

Stations 
 Langley Field, Virginia, October 18, - December 14, 1942
 Prince Sultan Air Base, Saudi Arabia, December 17, 2019 – Present

Aircraft 
 Boeing E-3G Sentry
 Douglas O-46
 North American O-47
 General Dynamics F-16CM Fighting Falcon
 McDonnell Douglas F-15E Strike Eagle
 McDonnell Douglas F-15C Eagle
 McDonnell Douglas AV-8B Harrier II
 McDonnell Douglas KC-10A Extender
 General Dynamics F-16C Fighting Falcon

Campaign

See also

 List of Air Expeditionary units of the United States Air Force

References

Citations

Bibliography

External links
 

0378
Military units and formations established in 2019